Kothigalu Saar Kothigalu (Kannada:ಕೋತಿಗಳು ಸಾರ್ ಕೋತಿಗಳು) is a 2001 Indian Kannada comedy film directed by Rajendra Singh Babu. The film stars Ramesh Aravind, S. Narayan, Mohan, Prema, Tara and Urvashi in the lead roles. This is the second film in the Saar series directed by Babu and was released on 28 December 2001 and received generally positive reviews from the critics and turned out to be a box office hit. It completed a 100-day run in theatres. The film was remade in Telugu as Sandade Sandadi (2002), in Hindi as Shaadi No. 1 (2005) and in Bengali (Bangladesh) as Tomakei Khujchi (2008).

Plot
Three friends; Rammi, Nani and Moni, vexed with their wives Urvashi, Prema and Tara decide to take a mass suicide. But they end up saving a businessman who was also attempting suicide. These men help Chandru in straightening out his business and earn a good salary to support their families. But they suffer from an after marriage problem. Their wives do not allow them to have sex. Urvasi is highly devotional and spends her days with fasting. Prema is a busy lawyer and she is more dedicated to her work than her family life. Tara is a TV actress and is more interesting in making love to the camera than to her husband.

At this juncture, Chandru is confronted with another problem. His foreign returned daughters are too fast for him to make them agree for an arranged marriage with the sons of his close pal. These guys throw an idea to Chandru that he should employ three good-looking guys and make his daughters fall in love with them. After that, the guys could ditch the girls so that they get back to their dad to ask forgiveness and accept his proposal. Lucky asks these three friends to do the roles of lovers in spite of knowing the fact that they are married. These friends attract the girls and when its time to ditch them, they found it too discouraging as they were offered five-star luxuries by Lucky during that time. So they decide to double cross him by marrying his daughters.

However, when their wives learns of these affairs, they confront Chandru for forcing their husbands. Chandru explains the reasoning of his act as he wanted his daughters to lead a happy life to which they accept. The trio again tries to kill themselves, but are saved by their wives. The trio conducts the marriage of the three girls, it is hinted at the end of the movie, however, that the three friends have not completely turned over a new leaf with the entrance of three girls whom they meet at the marriage.

Cast
 Ramesh Aravind as Vardharaja/Vardha/Rammi
 S. Narayan as Narayan/Nani
 Mohan as Mohan/Moni
 Prema as Lawyer Lalitha/Lalu, Nani's wife
 Urvashi as Almelu/Bondus, Rammi's wife
 Tara as Shalini/Shalu, Moni's wife
 Umashree as "Fitting" Muniyamma
 Mukhyamantri Chandru
 Rangayana Raghuas Police 
 Mandya Ramesh as Kalappa, Lalu's coworker
 Vainidhi Jagadish as Vainidhi

Soundtrack

Hamsalekha composed the music for the film and soundtracks, also writing the lyrics for all the soundtracks.

Awards and nominations

References

External links
Songs at Musicindiaonline

2001 films
2000s Kannada-language films
Films set in Bangalore
Films shot in Bangalore
Films scored by Hamsalekha
Indian comedy films
Indian film series
Kannada films remade in other languages
Films directed by Rajendra Singh Babu